Clubul Sportiv Municipal Roman, commonly known as CSM Roman, is a Romanian professional football team of the multi-sports club, CSM Roman from Roman, Neamț County, Romania. The team was founded in 1954 under the name of Laminorul Roman and was dissolved in 2018, due to poor results. The football section was re-founded in 2021 and enrolled in the Liga IV.

History
CSM Roman was founded in 1954 as Laminorul Roman by the syndicate of the Întreprinderea de Țevi Roman (Roman Pipe Enterprises, currently Mittal Steel) and played for twenty years in the regional and county championship.
The club promoted for the first time in Divizia C at the end of the 1973–74 season, when won the Neamț County Championship and the promotion play-off against the champion of Iași County, Șoimii Iași (2–1 at Roman and 1–1 at Iași), the team was composed of following players: A.Bălan, Niserciu (goalkeepers) – Musceleanu, C.Iamandi, Onu, Procopoaia, Ene, Ciocârlan, Tudosie, Mircea, Maticiuc, N.Iamandi, Dinu, Peisic, Ivanov.
Țevarii played in Divizia C for sixteen consecutive years until the 1989–90 season when was ranked 16th and relegated to Divizia D – Neamț County. In these years, he managed to finish the championship four times in 2nd place.

In the next season he returned quickly to the 3rd tier, but, despite the 6th position at the end of the 1991–92 season, he was relegated again because the Divizia C was restructured and only just first four ranked from every series remained in the third division.

After five seasons in the fourth tier, Laminorul, managed two successive promotions, from Divizia D – Neamț County to Divizia B.

In the summer of 2009, the club changed its name from FC Laminorul Roman to SCM Petrotub Roman.

In the summer of 2016, the club changed its name from SCM Petrotub Roman to CSM Roman.

On 31 October 2018, it was announced that CSM Roman withdrew from Liga III due to poor results. 

The football section was re-founded in 2021 and enrolled in the Liga IV.

Honours
Liga III
Winners (1): 1997–98
Runners-up (7): 1975–76, 1976–77, 1977–78, 1981–82, 2013–14
Liga IV – Neamț County
Winners (5): 1973–74, 1990–91,  1992–93,  1993–94, 1996–97
Runners-up (2): 1994–95, 1995–96

League history

Notable managers

  Ioan Radu
  Nicolae Zaharia

References

External links
Official website

Association football clubs established in 1954
Football clubs in Neamț County
Liga II clubs
Liga III clubs
Liga IV clubs
1954 establishments in Romania
Roman, Romania